Pingdu is the largest county-level city of Qingdao sub-provincial city, Shandong Province, China.

It is located in the east of the Shandong Peninsula (Jiaodong Peninsula), the heart of peninsula.

Administration
The administrative divisions of Pingdu have undergone a relatively large number of changes in the past thirty years. , Pingdu had five subdistricts,  12 towns and one other area:

As 2016, this city is divided to 5 subdistricts, 12 towns and 1 other.
Subdistricts

Towns

Others
Pingdu Export-oriented Industrial Processing Zone

Sports

The Pingdu Olympic Sports Centre Stadium, which has a capacity of 15,000, is the largest sports venue by capacity in Pingdu.

Transportation
Pingdu West railway station opened in 2015 on the Haitian−Qingdao railway. There are two departures and two arrivals per day. A second station, Pingdu railway station, opened with the Weifang–Laixi high-speed railway in 2020.

Climate

See also

Pingdu Campaign
Pingdu mine

References

 
Cities in Shandong
County-level divisions of Shandong
Geography of Qingdao